This is a timeline documenting events of Jazz in the year 1921.

Musicians born that year included Humphrey Lyttelton and Eddie Calhoun.

Events

 Bix Beiderbecke attended the Lake Forest Academy near Chicago, and got the opportunity to learn about the New Orleans and Chicago Jazz.
 Frankie Trumbauer worked for Isham Jones at the College Inn in Chicago.
 Sidney Bechet returns from his trip to Europe, and musicians like Duke Ellington become aware of his abilities.
 Fletcher Henderson is on the road with Ethel Waters. He hears Armstrong for the first time and immediately offers him a job. Armstrong turns him down.
 James P. Johnson starts approaching jazz with the recording of "Worried and Lonesome Blues" and "Carolina Shout". He becomes a pioneer of stride piano with these recordings.
 Saxophonist Coleman Hawkins joined the Mamie Smith's Jazz Hounds.
 Lennie Tristano takes an interest in piano at the age of two years.

Standards

 In 1921 the main standard published was "The Sheik of Araby".

Deaths

 April
 20 – Tony Jackson, American pianist, singer, and composer (born 1882).

Births

 January
 20 – Connie Haines, American singer (died 2008).
 22 – André Hodeir, French violinist (died 2011).
 30 – Bernie Leighton, American pianist (died 1994).
 31 – John Anderson, American trumpeter (died 1974).

 February
 12 – Hans Koller, Austrian tenor saxophonist and bandleader (died 2003).
 13 – Wardell Gray, American tenor saxophonist (died 1955).

 March
 1 – Kenny Baker, English trumpeter (died 1999).
 11 – Astor Piazzolla, Argentine tango composer, bandoneon player (died 1992).
 15 – Vinnie Burke, American bassist (died 2001).
 19 – Harry Babasin, American bassist (died 1988).
 20 – Jimmy Coe, American saxophonist (died 2004).
 26 – Joe Loco, American pianist and arranger (died 1988).

 April
 3 – Earl Washington, American pianist (died 1975).
 7 – Al Hayse, American trombonist (died 1982).
 13 – Dona Ivone Lara, Brazilian samba singer (died 2018).
 22 – Candido Camero, Cuban conga and bongo player (died 2020).
 26
 Jimmy Giuffre, American clarinet and saxophone player (died 2008).
 Preston Love, American saxophonist (died 2004).

 May
 6 – Freddy Randall, American trumpeter and bandleader (died 1999).
 20 – Jimmy Henderson, American trombonist and bandleader (died 1995).
 22 – Gustav Brom, Czech big band leader and clarinetist (died 1995).
 23 – Humphrey Lyttelton, English trumpeter (died 2008).
 28 – Al Tinney, American pianist (died 2002).
 31 – Alan Clare, British jazz pianist (died 1993).

 June
 2
 Ernie Royal, American trumpeter (died 1983).
 Marty Napoleon, American pianist (died 2015).
 7 – Tal Farlow, American guitarist (died 1998).
 15 – Erroll Garner, American pianist and composer (died 1977).
 17 – Tony Scott, American clarinetist (died 2007).

 July
 9 – Irv Kluger, American drummer (died 2006).
 17
 George Barnes, American guitarist (died 1977).
 Mary Osborne, American guitarist (died 1992).
 24 – Billy Taylor, American pianist and composer (died 2010).

 August
 4
 Herb Ellis, American guitarist (died 2010).
 Pat Friday, American singer (died 2016).
 6 – Buddy Collette, American flautist, saxophonist, and clarinetist (died 2010).
 7 – Warren Covington, American big band trombonist (died 1999).
 21 – Dennis Berry, English musician and composer (died 1994).
 28 – Tony Aless, American pianist (died 1988).

 September
 3 – Cab Kaye, English singer, pianist, and bandleader (died 2000).
 8 – Norris Turney, American flautist and saxophonist (died 2001).
 15 – Gene Roland, American composer and musician (died 1982).
 16 – Jon Hendricks, American lyricist and singer (died 2017).
 20
 Bill DeArango, American guitarist (died 2005).
 Chico Hamilton, American drummer and bandleader (died 2013).
 29 – Franny Beecher, American guitarist (died 2014).

 October
 3 – Leon Breeden, American clarinetist and saxophonist (died 2010).
 4 – Shifty Henry, American bassist (died 1958).
 10
 Julius Watkins, American French hornist (died 1977).
 Monk Montgomery, American bass guitarist (died 1982).
 Roy Kral, American pianist and singer (died 2002).
 18 – Willy Andresen, Norwegian pianist orchestra leader (died 2016).
 28 – Chico O'Farrill, Cuban composer and conductor (died 2001).

 November
 13 – Eddie Calhoun, American upright bassist (died 1993).
 20 – Norman O'Connor, American pianist (died 2003).
 23 – Jack Marshall, American guitarist, conductor, and composer (died 1973).

 December
 1 – John Bunch, American pianist (died 2010).
 26 – Steve Allen, American singer, songwriter, and television personality (died 2000).
 31 – Simon Brehm, Swedish upright bassist (died 1967).

See also 
 1921 in music

References

External links
 History Of Jazz Timeline: 1921 at All About Jazz

Jazz, 1921 In
Jazz by year